The 1994 San Jose mayoral election was held on June 7, 1994 to elect the mayor of San Jose, California. It saw the reelection of Susan Hammer. Because Hammer won an outright majority in the initial round of the election, no runoff election needed to be held.

Results

References

San Jose
San Jose
1994